The Sharqiya Sands (formerly known as Wahiba Sands ( or )) is a region of desert in Oman, The region was named for the Bani Wahiba tribe. Divided between the northern and southern governorates in the Eastern Region. The desert has been of scientific interest since a 1986 expedition by the Royal Geographical Society documented the diversity of the terrain, the flora and fauna, noting 16,000 invertebrates as well as 200 species of other wildlife, including avifauna. They also documented 150 species of native flora.

Geology

The desert was formed during the Quaternary period as a result of the forces of south-west blowing monsoon and the northern shamal trade wind, coming in from the east. Based on the types of dunes found in the area, it is divided into the high, or upper, Wahiba and low Wahiba. The upper area contains mega-ridge sand systems on a north–south line that are believed to have been formed by monsoon. The north and west boundaries of the desert are delineated by the fluvial systems Wadi Batha and Wadi Andam. Beneath the surface sands are an older layer of cemented carbonate sand. Alluvium deposits believed to have originated from the Wadi Batha during the Paleolithic era have been disclosed in the central desert  beneath the interdune surface. Wind erosion is believed to have contributed to the existence of a nearly level plain in the southwest.

Inhabitants
The area is occupied by Bedouins who congregate at Al-Huyawah, an oasis near the border of the desert, between June and September to gather dates. Tribes present in the area at the time of the Royal Geographical Society expedition included, predominantly, Al Wahiba (or Yal Wahiba) for whom the region is named, Al-Amr, Al-Bu-Isa, Hikman, Hishm and Janaba.

Gallery

See also
 Arabian Desert
 Al-Rub' Al-Khali

References

Sources

External links

Deserts of Oman